Vineta is one of the suburbs of the town of Swakopmund in Namibia. This neighbourhood is located to the north of the town centre and extends over 3 km along the Atlantic coast. To the east it borders on the C34 road and the Tamariskia neighbourhood.

When it was built in the 1950s, it was located about 1 km north of the town centre, with only sand and some shacks inhabited by the coloured people in between. Now the centre and Vineta form a contiguous area.

Most houses in Vineta originally belonged to white people in the inland, and the houses were used as holiday houses. Now it is inhabited by people belonging to the middle and the upper stratums of the society. There are also some apartment buildings, schools and recreational facilities in the neighbourhood.

Swakopmund Waterfront
A neighbourhood called Swakopmund Waterfront in a certain part of Vineta has been planned since 2002, but due to financial problems the construction began only in 2007. In 2004, the Waterfront was elevated to the status of a separate district, whereas earlier it had been part of Vineta. Finally, plans to build a 16,000 square metre area were approved. The construction is to be done by the South African company Safari Developments, worth 400 to 500 million Namibian dollars.

Finnish Private School
Finnish missionary children went to school in Swakopmund since 1945. As soon as the construction of the Vineta neighbourhood began, a school building for the Finnish Private School was built in Vineta. The school operated there from 1950 to 1989 excluding the school year 1986–87. The school had grades 1–9. With one exception, the students were children of the employees of the Finnish Missionary Society, whose parents lived mostly in Ovamboland and Kavango.

References

Swakopmund